The 1996 Pan American Race Walking Cup was held in Manaus, Amazonas, Brazil.  The track of the Cup runs in the Estrada da Ponta Negra.

Complete results, medal winners until 2011, and the results for the Mexican athletes were published.

Medallists

Results

Men's 20 km

Team

Men's 50 km

Team

Women's 10 km

Team

Participation
The participation of 66 athletes from 9 countries is reported.

 (1)
 (1)
 (11)
 (6)
 (8)
 (7)
 México (15)
 (2)
 (15)

See also
 1996 Race Walking Year Ranking

References

Pan American Race Walking Cup
Pan American Race Walking Cup
Pan American Race Walking Cup
International athletics competitions hosted by Brazil
International sports competitions in Manaus